Philip Catherine (born 27 October 1942) is a Belgian jazz guitarist.

Biography

Philip Catherine was born in London, England, to an English mother and Belgian father, and was raised in Brussels, Belgium. His grandfather was a violinist in the London Symphony Orchestra. Catherine started on guitar in his teens, and by seventeen he was performing professionally at local venues.

He released his debut album, Stream, in 1972. During the next few years, he studied at Berklee College of Music in Boston and with Mick Goodrick and George Russell. In 1976, he and guitarist Larry Coryell recorded and toured as an acoustic duo. The same year, when Jan Akkerman abruptly left Focus, Catherine replaced him in the band. The following year, he recorded with Charles Mingus, who dubbed him "Young Django". In the early 1980s, he toured briefly with Benny Goodman. He was in trio with Didier Lockwood and Christian Escoudé, then in a trio with Chet Baker. During the 1990s, he recorded three albums with trumpeter Tom Harrell.

Discography

As leader
 Stream (Warner Bros., 1972)
 September Man (Atlantic, 1974)
 Toots Thielemans/Philip Catherine & Friends (Keytone, 1974)
 Guitars (Atlantic, 1975)
 Twin-House with Larry Coryell (Elektra, 1977)
 Splendid with Larry Coryell (Elektra, 1978)
 Sleep My Love (CMP, 1979)
 Coryell/Catherine/Kuhn Live! (Elektra, 1980)
 Babel (Elektra, 1980)
 End of August (Wea, 1982)
 Catherine/Escoude/Lockwood: Trio (JMS, 1983)
 Transparence (Inak, 1987)
 September Sky with Hein Van de Geyn, Aldo Romano (September, 1988)
 Oscar (Igloo, 1990)
 I Remember You (Criss Cross, 1991)
 Moods Volume I (Criss Cross, 1992)
 Moods Volume II (Criss Cross, 1992)
 Spanish Nights with Niels-Henning Ørsted Pedersen, (Enja, 1992)
 Teenagers with Serge Delaite, George Mraz (Marcal, 1996)
 Live (Dreyfus, 1997)
 Guitar Groove (Dreyfus, 1998)
 Blue Prince (Dreyfus, 2000)
 Triangular (A Records, 2000)
 Summer Night (Dreyfus, 2002)
 Meeting Colours with Bert Joris & Brussels Jazz Orchestra (Dreyfus, 2005)
 Guitars Two (Dreyfus, 2007)
 Concert in Capbreton with Enrico Pieranunzi, Joe Labarbera, Hein Van De Geyn  (Dreyfus, 2010)
 Philip Catherine Plays Cole Porter (Challenge, 2011)
 Cote Jardin (Challenge, 2012)
 New Folks with Martin Wind (ACT, 2014)
 The String Project Live in Brussels (ACT, 2015)
 Bex/Catherine/Romano: La Belle Vie (Sunset, 2019)
 Manoir De Mes Reves with Paulo Morello, Sven Faller (Enja, 2019)

As sideman
With Chet Baker
 Crystal Bells (LDH, 1983)
 Chet's Choice (Criss Cross, 1985)
 Strollin' (Enja, 1986)
 In Bologna (Dreyfus, 1992)
 Estate (Domino, 2015)

With Kenny Drew
 Morning  (SteepleChase, 1976)
 In Concert (SteepleChase, 1979)
 And Far Away (Soul Note, 1983)

With Stephane Grappelli
 Les Valseuses (Festival, 1974)
 Young Django (MPS, 1979)
 Giants (MPS, 1981)
 Stephane Grappelli (MPS, 1987)
 Live 1992 (Birdology, 1992)

With Peter Herbolzheimer
 Wide Open (MPS, 1973)
 Scenes (MPS/BASF 1974)

With Joachim Kuhn
 Hip Elegy (MPS/BASF, 1976)
 Spring Fever (Atlantic, 1976)

With Rolf Kuhn
 Total Space (MPS/BASF 1975)
 Symphonic Swampfire (MPS, 1979)
 Cucu Ear (MPS, 1980)

With Marc Moulin
 Sam' Suffy (CBS, 1975)
 Into the Dark (Blue Note, 2001)
 Top Secret (Blue Note, 2001)
 Entertainment (Blue Note, 2004)
 Placebo Years 1971–1974 (Blue Note, 2006)
 I Am You (Blue Note, 2007)

With Niels-Henning Ørsted Pedersen
 Jaywalkin (SteepleChase, 1975)
 Double Bass (SteepleChase, 1976)
 Trio 1 (SteepleChase, 1978)
 Trio 2 (SteepleChase, 1978)
 The Viking (Pablo, 1983)
 Art of the Duo (Enja, 1993)

With Jean-Luc Ponty
 Open Strings (MPS/BASF 1972)
 Ponty/Grappelli (America, 1973)
 The Atacama Experience (Koch, 2007)

With others
 Larry Coryell, Back Together Again (Atlantic, 1977)
 Vladimir Cosma, Courage Fuyons (Warner Bros., 1979)
 Vladimir Cosma, Le Diner De Cons (Pomme Music, 1998)
 Laila Dalseth, A Woman's Intuition (Gemini, 1995)
 Antoine Duhamel & Ron Carter, Daddy Nostalgie (CBS, 1990)
 European Jazz Ensemble, At the Philharmonic Cologne (MA Music, 1989)
 European Jazz Ensemble, Meets the Khan Family (MA Music, 1992)
 Boulou Ferré & Ellios Ferré, Live in Montpellier (Le Chant Du Monde, 2007)
 Daniel Filipacchi, Anniversary Concert (Jazz Magazine, 1984)
 Laura Fygi, Introducing (Mercury, 1991)
 Laura Fygi, Bewitched (Verve Forecast, 1993)
 Richard Galliano, New Musette (Label Bleu, 1991)
 Herb Geller, An American in Hamburg (Nova, 1975)
 Michael Gibbs, Directs the Only Chrome-Waterfall Orchestra (Bronze, 1975)
 Dexter Gordon, Something Different (SteepleChase, 1975 [1980])
 Chris Hinze, Sister Slick (CBS, 1974)
 Chris Hinze, Bamboo Magic (Atlantic, 1978)
 Ingfried Hoffmann, Robbi, Tobbi Und Das Fliewatuut (Diggler, 2002)
 Francois Jeanneau, Ephemere (Owl, 1977)
 Eero Koivistoinen, Jazz Liisa 13 (Svart, 2017)
 Karin Krog, You Must Believe in Spring (Polydor, 1974)
 John Lee, Mango Sunrise (Blue Note, 1975)
 Roberto Magris, Current Views (Soul Note, 2009)
 Michael Mantler, More Movies (WATT Works, 1980)
 Charlie Mariano, Cascade (Keytone, 1974)
 Charlie Mariano, The Great Concert (Enja, 2009)
 Charles Mingus, Three or Four Shades of Blues (Atlantic, 1977)
 Airto Moreira, Misa Espiritual (Harmonia Mundi, 1983)
 Alphonse Mouzon, In Search of a Dream (MPS, 1978)
 Passport, Doldinger Jubilee '75 (Atlantic, 1975)
 Jacques Pelzer, Salute to the Band Box (Igloo, 1993)
 Jean Claude Petit, The Best of All Possible Worlds (WEA, 1980)
 Jean-Claude Petit, Salopes!! Vent De Panique (Milan, 1987)
 Enrico Pieranunzi, Alone Together (Challenge, 2001)
 Aldo Romano, Alma Latina (Owl, 1983)
 Zbigniew Seifert, Zbigniew Seifert (Capitol, 1977)
 Zbigniew Seifert, We'll Remember Zbiggy (Mood, 1979)
 Jack Sels, Sax Appeal (Relax, 1966)
 Jack Sels, Jack Sels (Best Seller, 1978)
 Baba Sissoko, Culture Griot (Cypres, 2009)
 Markus Stockhausen, Sol Mestizo (ACT, 1996)
 Toots Thielemans, Two Generations (Limetree, 1996)
 Toots Thielemans, Chez Toots (Private Music 1998)
 Jasper Van't Hof, Transitory (MPS/BASF 1974)
 Jasper Van't Hof, The Door Is Open (MPS/BASF 1976)
 Johan Verminnen, Traag Is Mooi (RCA, 1986)
 Johan Verminnen, Le Coeur Content (RCA, 1987)
 Jan Erik Vold & Chet Baker, Blamann! Blamann! (Hot Club, 1988)
 Barney Wilen, Sanctuary (IDA, 1991)
 Diederik Wissels & David Linx, If One More Day (Crepuscule, 1993)
 Robert Wyatt, Shleep (Hannibal, 1997)

References

External links

1942 births
Living people
20th-century British guitarists
21st-century British guitarists
English people of Belgian descent
English jazz guitarists
Belgian rock guitarists
Belgian jazz guitarists
English male guitarists
Musicians from London
Hot Club Records artists
ACT Music artists
20th-century British male musicians
21st-century British male musicians
British male jazz musicians
Focus (band) members
Gramavision Records artists
Criss Cross Jazz artists
Atlantic Records artists
Elektra Records artists
Enja Records artists
Igloo Records artists